Anson Foster Keeler (September 22, 1887 – September 29, 1943) was a Republican Connecticut State Comptroller from 1933 to 1935, and mayor of Norwalk, Connecticut, from 1927 to 1931. He served in the Connecticut Senate from the 26th district in 1931.

Biography 
Keeler was born on September 22, 1887, in Brooklyn, New York City. He was the son of John Foster Keeler and Mary Gazetta Foster. He was a descendant of Ralph Keeler, one of the founding settlers of Norwalk. He served in the U.S. Army during World War I.

He died on September 29, 1943, at the Veterans Hospital in Newington, Connecticut.

Memberships
 Freemasons, Shriners, Elks, Moose, and Redmen

References 

1887 births
1943 deaths
United States Army personnel of World War I
American Congregationalists
Connecticut Comptrollers
Republican Party Connecticut state senators
Mayors of Norwalk, Connecticut
People from Brooklyn
United States Army soldiers
20th-century American politicians